DePree is a surname. It may refer to:
D. J. DePree, American businessman and founder of Herman Miller; father of Max
Hopwood DePree, American actor, director, producer, and screenwriter
Hugo de Pree (1870–1943), British Army officer
James DePree (1879–1972), American football player and football and baseball coach
Max De Pree, American businessman and writer; son of D. J.